Enniscrone/Kilglass is a Gaelic Athletic Association club based in the barony of Tireragh in West Sligo, comprising the parish of Kilglass in County Sligo, Republic of Ireland.

Marty Duffy, who refereed the 2009 All-Ireland Senior Football Championship Final, is from the club, as is his brother Michael, who also refereed at national level.

Honours
 Sligo Senior Football Championship: (3)
 1914, 1916 (Kilglass - 1929)
 Sligo Intermediate Football Championship: (1)
 1991
 Sligo Junior Football Championship: (2)
 1948, 1966
 Sligo Under 20 Football Championship: (1)
 1990
 Sligo Minor Football Championship: (3)
 1950, 1975, 2016 (amalgamated with Easkey in 2016)
 Sligo Under-16 Football Championship: (2)
 1973, 1979
 Sligo Under-14 Football Championship: (1)
 2004
 Sligo Under-12 Football Championship: (1)
 2002
 Sligo Intermediate Football League Division 3 (ex Div. 2): (5)
 1986, 1988, 1996, 2004, 2017
 Benson Cup: (1)
 2004
 Abbott Cup (1)
 2014

References

External links
 Enniscrone Kilglass GAA Club

Gaelic games clubs in County Sligo